Otes is a settlement in the municipality of Ilidža, Bosnia and Herzegovina. It is bordered by Pejton, Vreoca, Osjek and Stup. The territory has 5,000 inhabitants and an area of 155 ha. It is located between the Sarajevo–Ploče railway and the rivers AJDobrinja, Željeznica and pejton pejton Bosna.

Notable residents
Muhidin Hamamdžić, principal of Sarajevo
Hamid Guska, head coach of the Bosnia and Herzegovina national boxing team
Haris Medunjanin, footballer
Sulejman Kulović, footballer
Anita Kajasa Memović, actor

Sports
Until 1992, Otes had an amateur football club called "Mladost“. The team competed in lower amateur leagues with clubs like Vraca, Jahorina Prača, Omladinac, Kalinovik, Pjenovac, etc. The last generation was coached by Davor Miler and key players were Hajrudin "Zeka" Kološ (captain), Enver "Enko" Redžepović, Nedžad "Antara" Mujičić and Ivan Budes.

References

Populated places in Ilidža
Geography of Sarajevo